Ihor Yevdokymovych Turchyn (16 November 1936 – 7 November 1993) was a Ukrainian handball coach, who headed the Soviet and then Ukrainian national teams from 1973 to 1993, bringing them to three Olympic and five world championship medals.

Biography 
In 1959 Turchyn assembled a handball team of teenage girls, which in 1962 became HC Spartak Kyiv. The club became 20-time Soviet champion (1969–1988) and 13-time winner of the EHF Champions League (1970–1973, 1975, 1977, 1979, 1981, 1983, 1985–1988).

In 1965 he married Zinaida Stolitenko, a trainee 10 years his junior. They had a daughter Natalia (born 1971) and a son Mikhail (born 1983). Natalia played handball alongside her mother for Spartak Kyiv, while Mikhail went into basketball. In his last years Turchyn suffered several heart attacks. He underwent a complex bypass surgery in Norway, and after that coached the Norwegian women's handball team for eight months. He died of a heart attack during an EHF Cup match in Romania in 1993. After his death his wife took over his coaching positions with Spartak Kyiv and the Ukrainian national team.

Awards
 Order of the Red Banner of Labour (1976, 1980)
 Order of the Badge of Honour (1971)
 Order of Friendship of Peoples (1985)

References

External links
 Биография Игоря Турчина

1936 births
1993 deaths
Merited Coaches of the Soviet Union
Recipients of the Order of Friendship of Peoples
Ukrainian handball coaches
Soviet handball coaches
Russian handball coaches
Medalists at the 1988 Summer Olympics
Medalists at the 1980 Summer Olympics
Medalists at the 1976 Summer Olympics
Olympic gold medalists for the Soviet Union
Olympic bronze medalists for the Soviet Union